Platinumb Heart is the name of two albums by South African singer Msaki, both released on November 19, 2021.

Open

Platinumb Heart Open was produced by Neo Muyanga and Msaki, except for Track 3, which was produced by TRESOR and Batundi.

Track listing

Beating

Platinumb Heart Beating focuses on Electronic music mixed with Amapiano elements. Unlike Open, the album features various producers like Sun-El Musician, Kabza De Small and Black Coffee.

Track listing

Critical reception

Year-end lists

Commercial performance 
The double album has surpassed 1 million streams on Spotify globally.

Accolades 
Platinumb Heart Open won Best Alternative Album  at 2022 Clout Africa Awards. At the 28th South African Music Awards  Platinumb Heart Open won two awards for Female Artist of the Year, Best Contemporary Album of the Year, nominated for Best Produced Album of the Year, and Best Collaboration ("No Rainbow" featuring Da Capo). 

!
|-
| 2022
| rowspan="4"|Platinumb Heart Open
| Best Alternative Album
|
|
|-
| rowspan="4"|2022
| Female Artist of the Year 
| 
| rowspan="3"|
|-
|Best Produced Album of the Year  
|
|-
|Best Adult Contemporary Album
| 
|-
| "No Rainbow"
| Best Collaboration  
|
|

Release history

References

2021 albums